The Yin River (Yin Chaung) is a river in Magway Region, in central Burma (Myanmar), a tributary of the Irrawaddy.

See also
List of rivers of Burma

References

Rivers of Myanmar
Magway Region